Garth Brooks: Live in LA is a series of benefit concerts held by American country pop singer Garth Brooks in 2008. The five concerts, all held at Staples Center in Los Angeles, California, were benefits for Fire Intervention Relief Effort, serving those impacted by the 2007 California wildfires. 100% of ticket prices were donated directly to the charity.

Originally intended to be only one concert, extremely high ticket demand was seen, resulting in the addition of four shows (all of which sold out in 59 minutes); Brooks subsequently became the first artist ever to perform five concerts in two days. He was accompanied by wife Trisha Yearwood, who performed as well. The second concert of the series was broadcast live on CBS, with on-screen information available for viewers to donate to the charity.

Set list
This set list is representative of the second performance on January 25, 2008. It does not represent all concerts for the duration of the series.

"The Thunder Rolls"
"Callin' Baton Rouge"
"Rodeo"
"More Than a Memory"
"We Shall Be Free" 
"Two of a Kind, Workin' on a Full House"
"The Beaches of Cheyenne"
"Papa Loved Mama"
"In Another's Eyes" (duet with Trisha Yearwood)
"Two Pina Coladas"
"Workin' for a Livin'"
"Friends in Low Places"
"Much Too Young (To Feel This Damn Old)"
"The River"
"The Fever"
"That Summer"
"The Dance"
"Ain't Goin' Down ('Til the Sun Comes Up)"
Encores
"Unanswered Prayers"
"Fire and Rain" (James Taylor cover)
"Amarillo By Morning" (George Strait cover)
"Ten Feet Away" (Keith Whitley cover)
"Night Moves" (Bob Seger cover)
"Piano Man" (Billy Joel cover)
"American Pie" (Don McLean cover)

Personnel
 Robert Bailey – backing vocals
 Garth Brooks – vocals, acoustic guitar
 David Gant – keyboards
 Johnny Garcia – electric guitar
 Mark Greenwood – bass guitar, backing vocals
 Vicki Hampton – backing vocals
 Gordon Kennedy – electric guitar
 Huey Lewis – vocals and harmonica on "Workin' for a Livin'"
 Jimmy Mattingly – fiddle, acoustic guitar, backing vocals
 Mike Palmer – drums, percussion
 Crystal Taliefero – percussion, backing vocals
 Trisha Yearwood – vocals on "In Another's Eyes"

Tour dates

See also
List of Garth Brooks concert tours

References

Benefit concerts in the United States
Garth Brooks concert tours